Postillion Rock is a small ice-free rock in the north part of Neny Fjord, lying close south of Roman Four Promontory along the west coast of Graham Land. First surveyed in 1936 by the British Graham Land Expedition (BGLE) under Rymill. Resurveyed in 1949 by the Falkland Islands Dependencies Survey (FIDS) and so named by them because of its outlying position.

References

Rock formations of Graham Land
Fallières Coast